Henry Cumberbatch may refer to:
 Henry Arnold Cumberbatch (1858–1918), British diplomat
 Henry Carlton Cumberbatch (1900–1966), his son, British Royal Navy officer